The Church of St Mary-in-the-Baum is a church in the town of Rochdale, Greater Manchester, England. Commissioned in 1738, and opened in 1742 as a chapel of ease, the chapel was extended in the 19th century. In the very early 20th century the church authorities determined to construct a new building and they commissioned Ninian Comper to undertake the task. Comper designed a completely new church to an unusual plan, due to the constriction of the urban site. He incorporated elements of the original chapel into the new design.

St Mary's remains an active parish church in the Anglican Diocese of Manchester. It is a Grade I listed building.

History
The first church on the present site was a chapel of ease opened in 1742. The name supposedly derives from the fields of Melissa plant which grew on the site. The land and much of the funding was supplied by Samuel Chetham, of Turton Tower and Castleton Hall and High Sheriff of Lancashire in 1738. The church was extended in the 19th century but by the 20th was in a state of disrepair. The parish authorities determined that repairing the structure would be more expensive than the construction of a new building and commissioned Ninian Comper to design a new church. Sir Ninian Comper (1864-1960) was born in Scotland. Specialising in ecclesiastical architecture, he established a major practice as one of the last proponents of the Gothic Revival. Respecting the parishioners’ affection for the original chapel, Comper incorporated elements from it into the new structure including the altar and the bell-cot.

The church remains an active parish church in the Rochdale parish.

Architecture and description
The site of the church was restricted, to which Comper responded with an unusual floor plan. The nave and chancel are both placed on the south side, to take advantage of the light, while two aisles run along the north side. The architectural style is also rare; the brief required Comper to respect and reflect the design of the original chapel. The body of the church is his trademark Perpendicular Gothic, while the exterior aisle wall is Neoclassical. The church is built of red brick, with ashlar dressings. Claire Hartwell and Matthew Hyde, in their 2004 revised Lancashire: Manchester and the South-East Pevsner, describe the "sensationally high nave [as] uniquely effective’’.

The interior contains a memorial stained glass window by Comper which commemorates the members of the parish killed in the First and Second World Wars. Also by Comper are two Christ Pantocrators, images of a beardless adult Jesus unusual in Christian iconography. The church is a Grade I listed building.

See also

Grade I listed churches in Greater Manchester
Grade I listed buildings in Greater Manchester
Listed buildings in Rochdale

Notes

References

Sources

External links 

Grade I listed churches in Greater Manchester
Rochdale
Buildings and structures in Rochdale
Churches completed in 1911
20th-century Church of England church buildings